Dusino San Michele is a comune (municipality) in the Province of Asti in the Italian region Piedmont, located about  southeast of Turin and about  west of Asti.

Dusino San Michele borders the following municipalities: Cantarana, San Paolo Solbrito, Valfenera, Villafranca d'Asti, and Villanova d'Asti.

References

Cities and towns in Piedmont